Admiral Sir Nigel Stuart Henderson,  (1 August 1909 – 2 August 1993) was a Royal Navy officer who served as Chairman of the NATO Military Committee from 1968 to 1971.

Naval career
Henderson joined the Royal Navy in 1927. He served in the Second World War as a gunnery officer. After the war he became Naval Attaché in Rome and then, from 1951, commanded the patrol vessel .

Henderson was appointed Commanding Officer at the Royal Naval Air Station at Bramcote in 1952 and was Captain of the cruiser  from 1955. He became Vice Naval Deputy and then Naval Deputy to the Supreme Allied Commander Europe in 1957 and Director General of Training at the Admiralty in 1960. In 1962 he was made Commander-in-Chief, Plymouth. He was made Head of the British Defence Staff in Washington, D.C. and UK Military Representative to NATO in 1965 and then Chairman of the NATO Military Committee in 1968. He retired in 1971.

Writing in 1974 Henderson expressed concern over a general lack of awareness about "Western Europe and indeed of all NATO countries being dependent very largely on Middle East oil".

Personal life
Henderson married Catherine Mary Maitland in 1939. They had three children, a son and two daughters. In 1959 Lady Henderson inherited the estate of Hensol House near Castle Douglas from her godmother Helen, Marchioness of Ailsa. The couple retired there in 1971.

In retirement Henderson spearheaded the effort to restore the Scottish birthplace of John Paul Jones at Arbigland back to its original 1747 condition. He was also a Deputy Lieutenant of the Stewartry of Kirkcudbright and a Patron of the Ten Tors Challenge held each year on Dartmoor.

References

|-

|-

|-

|-

|-

1909 births
1993 deaths
Deputy Lieutenants of Kirkcudbright
Knights Commander of the Order of the Bath
Knights Grand Cross of the Order of the British Empire
NATO military personnel
Royal Navy admirals
Royal Navy officers of World War II
British naval attachés